Telipok is a town located approximately 15 kilometres north of Kota Kinabalu, the state capital of Sabah, Malaysia. The town is within the administration of Kota Kinabalu City Hall and is a sub-district of the city. It is also part of the urban expanse of Kota Kinabalu, and of its metropolitan area. It is situated near Kota Kinabalu Industrial Park, and is within 5 kilometres of the towns of Manggatal, Sepanggar, and Tuaran.

History 
During World War II, Telipok is served as a military base where the Kinabalu Guerillas led by Albert Kwok actively operating to fight the Japanese.

Refugees slum 

Telipok are notoriously known as one of the spots of Filipino refugees slum, where 
frequent crimes such as robbery and cable theft happens. Due to the rampant crimes, there has been many proposals to repatriated all the refugees to their country or move to a border island.

References 

Towns in Sabah